Orologas is a Greek surname. It means "watchmaker" (occupational surname). Its female version is Orologa.

Notable examples
Gregory Orologas (1864–1922), Greek Orthodox metropolitan bishop
Gervasios Orologas, Greek Orthodox metropolitan bishop
Petros Orologas (1892-1958), journalist and newspaper publisher
Alexandros Orologas, journalist and newspaper publisher, brother of the above

Greek-language surnames
Surnames
Occupational surnames